Podhorany may refer to several places in Slovakia notably in the Prešov Region.

Podhorany, Kežmarok District
Podhorany, Nitra District
Podhorany, Prešov District